The 2010 Supersport World Championship was the twelfth FIM Supersport World Championship season—the fourteenth taking into account the two held under the name of Supersport World Series. The season started on 28 February at Phillip Island and finished on 3 October at Magny-Cours after thirteen rounds. The championship supported the Superbike World Championship at every round.

Kenan Sofuoğlu clinched the title at the final round after a season-long battle with Eugene Laverty. Joan Lascorz was also in contention for most of the season but suffered a season-ending injury at Silverstone, however he amassed enough points to claim third place.

Race calendar and results
The provisional race schedule was publicly announced by FIM on 6 October 2009 with the most notable change from the 2009 Superbike World Championship season being the dropping of the round at Losail, Qatar. For the first time in series history, a race was run on a day other than Sunday, with the race at Miller Motorsports Park being held on Monday 31 May. These races ran as part of the Memorial Day weekend in the United States. The FIM altered the calendar on 22 January 2010 with Silverstone replacing Donington Park as the host of the British round.

Championship standings

Riders' standings

Manufacturers' standings

Entry list

All entries used Pirelli tyres.

References

External links

World
Supersport World Championship seasons
World
World